Joyful Noise Recordings is an independent record label from Indianapolis, Indiana. The label was founded in 2003 in Bloomington, Indiana by Karl Hofstetter, who also played drums on many of the label's first releases. Joyful Noise maintains an active roster of over 30 bands playing various musical styles, though according to the label, each artist "in one way or another bridges the gap between pop and noise."

History
In 2010 Joyful Noise began focusing largely on limited edition specialty releases which are generally released on analog formats packaged with music downloads. In addition to releases on vinyl records, the label has gained notoriety for being at the forefront of the resurgence of cassette tapes and flexi-discs, as reported by The Washington Post, Pitchfork Media, Under The Radar, and others.
 
Joyful Noise has released single-album cassettes from Akron/Family, Dinosaur Jr., Deerhoof, of Montreal, Here We Go Magic, and others, and has released multi-album Cassette Box Sets from Dinosaur Jr., of Montreal, and Joan Of Arc.

In 2012 Joyful Noise released their first album to chart on Billboard: Kishi Bashi "151a" (debuting at #6 on the "Heatseekers" chart). Since that time, new music on Joyful Noise from artists such as Sebadoh, Dumb Numbers, David Yow, Son Lux, Swamp Dogg, Tropical Fuck Storm, Deerhoof, Why? and others have all charted.

From 2012 to 2016, in the spirit of continuing to explore musical community-building through the release of cult artists in obsolete audio-reproduction formats, Joyful Noise offered its monthly Flexi-Disc singles series. Each disc in the series is of peculiar and notable value as a rarity but some particularly memorable entries include Son Lux's cover of Jean Ritchie's "Black Waters", several Melvins & Joan of Arc-related tracks, a duet by Sufjan Stevens & Stranger Cat, Tortoise, Don Caballero and Daniel Johnston.

The Flexi-Disc's brief renaissance was the second wave of obsolete-format-driven record sales originally conceived of and innovated by Joyful Noise (after cassette-tapes), later to be duplicated by other labels in the independent music world. JNR is also known for producing lathe-cut records, twelve-sided records, records-that-are-also-musical-instruments and a number of other more bizarre and bespoke musical artifacts.

In 2013, JNR released the first 7" in their Cause & Effect series—an ongoing project pairing JNR artists (appearing on the A-Side) with artists who have influenced them (appearing on the b-side).

In 2014, Joyful Noise started their annual Artist-In-Residence program: working with seasoned cult artists to release the "pure-gold material they've got in the cans that's never found a venue for release" and to continue to support their ongoing work. JNR Artists-In-Residence have included: Tim Kinsella (Joan of Arc, Cap'n Jazz et al.), Rob Crow (Pinback, Goblin Cock, Optiganally Yours, et al.), Jad Fair (Half-Japanese), Thor Harris (Swans), and Kramer (Shimmy-Disc), Deerhoof, and Yonatan Gat + Stone Tapes.

In 2017, Joyful Noise began releasing their White Label series: undiscovered records selected by renowned musicians either represented or friendly with the label. Yoni Wolf of Why? selected Creature Native by The Ophelias as the first-entry in the White Label Series and the band was ultimately drafted to become part of the label's roster. Other curators of the White Label series include Devendra Barnhart, Janet Weiss (Sleater Kinney), Kelley Deal (The Breeders), Mirah, Aesop Rock, Alex Somers, Blanck Mass, Kid Millions, Meredith Graves, Make Watt, Serengeti, tUNE-yARDs, Astronautilus, Cate Le Bon, Circuit des Yeux, Julianna Barwick, Sondre Lerche, St. Vincent, Thurston Moore and others.

A Tropical Fuck Storm poster and (fellow Joyful Noise Recordings artist) No Joy LP made a brief cameo appearance in the 2022 Jordan Peele film, Nope.

Radical projects & experiments 
The label is known for candid identification with and support of radical and revolutionary politics. They released collaborations between Bernie Sanders & Thurston Moore, done fundraising to oppose the Trump Administration through the release of Anal Trump records and stood in solidarity with Black Lives Matter during the George Floyd protests.

In 2020, JNR founded the Church of Noise to build and perpetuate musically empowered community during the coronavirus pandemic and through the longtail of its fallout. In 2021, the label was featured in the New York Times as the only independent label interviewed in pursuit of a solution to the vinyl manufacturing slowdown (by doing lathe cut previews of vinyl albums that might take a six months to a year to make it through the manufacturing queue).

As the major focus of 2022 artist in residence Joyful Noise Recordings devoted resources to launching the sub-label Stone Tapes, an "End of World Music" imprint, devoted to exploring multicultural styles of sound in combination with state-of-the-art production, and reinforced by personnel from the outer-limits of "radically experimental" independent music, to Yonatan Gat who serves as producer, curator, guitarist or otherwise general collaborator on Stone Tapes releases. This project was inspired by the eponymous debut album of the Stone Tapes imprint Medicine Singers, one of the emergent acts in the evolving post-genre(s) Scorched Earth Music or End of World Music.

Bands

Current roster 

 Big Business
 Busman's Holiday
 CJ Boyd
 Cedric Noel
 Dale Crover
 David Yow
 Deerhoof
 Divorcee
 Dumb Numbers 
 Eerie Wanda
 El Ten Eleven
 Goblin Cock
 Half Japanese
 Helvetia

 Hew Time
 J Fernandez
 Jad Fair
 Jason Loewenstein
Jess Joy
 Joan of Arc
 Kidbug
 Kishi Bashi
 KO
 Kramer
 Lil Bub
 Lou Barlow
 The Low Anthem
 Magic Sword
 Memory Map

 Mike Adams At His Honest Weight
 Mythless
 No Joy
 OHMME
 Oneida
 The Ophelias
 Psychic Temple
 Rafter
 Reptar
 Rob Crow
 Richard Edwards
 Sedcairn Archives
 Serengeti
 Sisyphus

 Sleep Party People
 Sound of Ceres
 Suuns
 Stranger Cat
 Swamp Dogg
 Tall Tall Trees
 Tim Kinsella
 Thor Harris
 Toshi Kasai
 Tropical Fuck Storm
 Victor Villarreal
 WHY?
 Yonatan Gat
 Yoni & Geti

"Open Relationships" 

Akron/Family
Anal Trump
Ava Luna
Birthmark
Born Ruffians
 Brian Marella
Built to Spill
 Childbite
Chris Cohen
Cloud Nothings
Daniel Johnston
Danielson
David Lynch
Dead Rider
Dinosaur Jr. 

 Divorcée
DM Stith
Don Caballero
Eric Gaffney
Fang Island
 Father Murphy
Godspeed You! Black Emperor
Hella
Here We Go Magic
 Jad Fair & Norman Blake
Japandroids
 The Jesus Lizard
 Jorma Whittaker
Julianna Barwick
King Buzzo

 KO
Le Butcherettes
Lee Ranaldo
Make Believe
Marmoset
Marnie Stern
Melvins
Monotonix
Mount Eerie
 Natural Dreamers
of Montreal
Ought
Owls
 Pattern is Movement
 Prince Rama

Protomartyr
Qui
Racebannon
Richard Swift
The Sea and Cake
 S.M. Wolf
Son Lux
 Sonny & The Sunsets
Sondre Lerche
Sufjan Stevens
 Swaps
 Swirlies
Talk Normal
Tera Melos
Thee Oh Sees

 
 Thom Fekete
Thurston Moore
Tortoise
 The Unspeakable Practices
Wye Oak
 Yip Deceiver

Past roster 

 Abner Trio
 Berry
 Big Bear
 Bizzart
 Crosss
 The Delicious
 Hermit Thrushes
 Hi Red Center
 I Love You (Yah Tibyah La Blu)
 Jookabox
 Lafcadio
 Man at Arms

 Manners for Husbands
 Melk the g6-49
 Prizzy Prizzy Please
 Push-Pull
 Receptor Sight
 Richard Edwards
 Sebadoh
 Solos
 Stationary Odyssey
 Surfer Blood
 Valina

Subscriptions and series

Artist in Residence
Starting in 2014, Joyful Noise began hosting artists for year-long residencies in which they release new music exclusively on the label. 
Yonatan Gat & Stone Tapes 2022
Kramer 2020
Thor Harris 2019
Rob Crow 2018
Deerhoof 2017
Tim Kinsella 2015
Jad Fair 2014

Flexi Disc Series

In late 2011 Joyful Noise announced their 2012 Flexi Disc Series, which featured singles from Deerhoof, Jad Fair, Lou Barlow, of Montreal, and others. Each artist contributed a single song which is not available anywhere else. Each Flexi Disc was limited to 500 copies, and were sold as a monthly subscription. Now in its fourth year, the Flexi Disc series has upped their distribution to 1000 copies of each single and grown to include acts such as Cloud Nothings, Sonny & the Sunsets, Lee Ranaldo, Thurston Moore and Sufjan Stevens.

2012 Artists
Lou Barlow
Make Believe
Jad Fair
Danielson
Deerhoof
Dead Rider
Rafter
of Montreal
Tortoise
Racebannon
Akron/Family
Richard Swift

2013 Artists
Birthmark
Built to Spill & Helvetia
Hella
Here We Go Magic
Melvins
Mike Adams At His Honest Weight
Monotonix
Rob Crow
Son Lux
Sufjan Stevens and Cat Martino
The Sea and Cake
WHY?

2014 Artists
Big Business
Born Ruffians
Daniel Johnston
DM Stith
Fang Island
Half Japanese
Margot & the Nuclear So and So's
Mount Eerie
Owls
Serengeti
Yip Deceiver

2015 Artists
Arousal
Cloud Nothings
Deerhoof and Celestial Shore
Goblin Cock
King Buzzo
Lee Ranaldo
Oneida
Pattern is Movement
Protomartyr
Sonny & the Sunsets
Tera Melos
Wye Oak

Discography

2020's

2010's

2000's

See also
 List of record labels

References

External links
 Official Website
 Discogs
 Secretly Distribution

Record labels established in 2003
American independent record labels
Indie rock record labels
Experimental music record labels
Mass media in Indianapolis